Harrow County is an American comic book series that ran from 2015 to 2018. It was created by writer Cullen Bunn and artist Tyler Crook, and published by Dark Horse Comics.

Characters
Emmy Crawford An eighteen-year-old young woman and witch, presumed to be the reincarnation of the witch Hester Beck. She has godlike abilities that allow her to reshape reality at will.

Bernice Anderson Emmy's best friend, granddaughter of Riah Anderson, and student of Lovey Belfont. She lives in the Black community of Mason's Hollow. She is the protagonist of the sequel series Tales from Harrow County.

Kammi Emmy's evil twin sister and one of the primary antagonists of the series. She grew up in New York City.

Isaac Crawford Emmy's adoptive father. He was created by Hester and was one of the townsfolk that murdered her.

Lady Lovey Belfont An old woman that has spent her life capturing the servants of Hester Beck. She lives alone in Mason's Hollow, where she is shunned by her community for being a witch. She teaches hedge magic to Bernice and tasks her with protecting Harrow County.

Haints
The Skinless Boy / The Tattered Skin Emmy's mute familiar. He was summoned from the nightmares of a child. Emmy carries his skin around in her satchel and he whispers secrets to her.

Priscilla A goblin that befriends Emmy.

The Family
Malachi The head of the Family in the old days, until he became the Abandoned and settled in Harrow County.

Hester Beck The primary antagonist of the series.  She was a god-like witch who was killed by her own creations. Of all of Malachi's children, she was the youngest and his favorite.

Amaryllis A kindly old woman and the most powerful in the family. Like Hester, she was capable of bending all of reality to her will. Hester murdered and cannibalized her to gain her powers.

Odessa The head of the family after Malachi leaves. She has a connection to the woods and their animals.

Levi A psychopomp. He guides the dead to the afterlife. When Malachi was the head of the family, Levi would try to find ways to undermine him.

Other Family members include Mildred, Willa, Kaine, Corbin, and Old Buck.

Publication history

Harrow County
Harrow County began as a serialized prose story called Countless Haints, written by Cullen Bunn and released on his website. Countless Haints ran for ten chapters before it was retired. Later the story was repurposed as an ongoing comic with artist and co-creator Tyler Crook. The main character Madrigal was renamed Emmy, the time period was shifted from present day to the 1930s, and the location was changed from Ahmen's Landing to Harrow County.

When Bunn began working on the series, he wrote the first two arcs so that they told a fairly complete story, though he hoped Harrow County would be popular enough to become an ongoing series. Crook chose to do the book in watercolors to get away from the computer and to make the project more fun for himself. As part of the promotional material for the comic, he created a special ordering form and made process videos showcasing his watercolors. He even wrote music for the first two arcs.

During Harrow County’s run, Cullen Bunn and Tyler Crook regularly shared their process in a column called The Harrow County Observer, Tyler Crook's YouTube channel, and in the extensive sketchbook sections of the trade paperback collections.

{| class="wikitable mw-collapsible mw-collapsed" style="text-align: center"
!colspan=6|Harrow County issues
|-
!Story Arc
!Issue
!Release Date
!Story
!Art
!Extras
|-
|colspan=6 style=background:#bc4026|
|-
|rowspan=4|CountlessHaints
|#1
|May 13, 2015Second Printing:June 17, 2015Halloween ComicFest:October 29, 2016
|rowspan=4|Cullen Bunn
|ART: Tyler CrookCOVER: Tyler CrookJason Latour (HeroesCon variant)Jeff Lemire (Four Color Grails variant)Tyler Crook (Second printing)Tyler Crook (Halloween ComicFest)
|
Tales of Harrow County: Baptism
Let's Talk About the Tree (essay)
|-
|#2
|June 10, 2015
|rowspan=3|Tyler Crook
|
Tales of Harrow County: What was Lost
Let's Talk About Ghosts (essay)
Pinup by Joëlle Jones
|-
|#3
|July 8, 2015
|
Tales of Harrow County: All Hallows' Eve
Sleeping with Water Moccasins (essay)
Pinup by Shane White
|-
|#4
|August 12, 2015
|
Let's Talk About the Farmhouse (essay)
|-
|colspan=6 style=background:#dda628|
|-
|rowspan=4|TwiceTold
|#5
|September 9, 2015
|rowspan=4|Cullen Bunn
|rowspan=4|Tyler Crook
|
Tales of Harrow County: The Bat House
El Guapo, Ghost of Tower Plaza (essay)
Pinup by Cat Farris
|-
|#6
|October 14, 2015
|
Tales of Harrow County: The Hunter
Letters column
Pinup by JOK
|-
|#7
|November 11, 2015
|
Tales of Harrow County: Daughters
Letters column
Pinup by Bryan Fyffe
|-
|#8
|December 9, 2015
|
Tales of Harrow County: Mold
Letters column
|-
|colspan=6 style=background:#b5b59d|
|-
|rowspan=6|SnakeDoctor
|#9
|February 10, 2016
|Cullen Bunn
|ART: Carla Speed McNeilCOLORS: Jenn Manley LeeLETTERING & COVER: Tyler Crook
|
Tales of Harrow County: Friends
|-
|colspan=5 style=background:#b5b59d|
|-
|#10
|March 9, 2016
|rowspan=2|Cullen Bunn
|rowspan=2|Tyler Crook
|
Tales of Harrow County: The Butcher
|-
|#11
|April 13, 2016
|
Tales of Harrow County: Haint Train
Fear and Love of the Devil Himself (essay)
Letters column
|-
|colspan=5 style=background:#b5b59d|
|-
|#12
|May 11, 2016
|Cullen Bunn
|ART: Hannah LavenderCOVER: Tyler Crook
|
Tales of Harrow County: The Holler
|-
|colspan=6 style=background:#ad9859|
|-
|rowspan=4|FamilyTree
|#13
|June 8, 2016
|rowspan=4|Cullen Bunn
|rowspan=4|Tyler Crook
|
Tales of Harrow County: The Butler (Part 1)
Letters column
|-
|#14
|July 13, 2016
|
Tales of Harrow County: The Butler (Part 2)
Letters column
|-
|#15
|August 10, 2016
|
Tales of Harrow County: The Butler (Part 3)
Letters column
|-
|#16
|September 14, 2016
|
Tales of Harrow County: The Butler (Part 4)
Letters column
|-
|colspan=6 style=background:#b5783b|
|-
|rowspan=5|Abandoned
|#17
|October 19, 2016
|rowspan=2|Cullen Bunn
|rowspan=2|ART: Carla Speed McNeilCOLORS: Jenn Manley LeeLETTERING & COVERS: Tyler Crook
|
Tales of Harrow County: The Tithe
Letters column
|-
|#18
|November 23, 2016
|
Tales of Harrow County: Priscilla (Part 1)
Letters column
|-
|colspan=6 style=background:#b5783b|
|-
|#19
|December 28, 2016
|rowspan=2|Cullen Bunn
|rowspan=2|Tyler Crook
|
Tales of Harrow County: Priscilla (Part 2)
Letters column
|-
|#20
|January 25, 2017
|
Tales of Harrow County: Priscilla (Part 3)
Letters column
|-
|colspan=6 style=background:#968e39|
|-
|rowspan=4|HedgeMagic
|#21
|March 8, 2017
|rowspan=4|Cullen Bunn
|rowspan=4|Tyler Crook
|
Tales of Harrow County: Priscilla (Part 4)
|-
|#22
|April 12, 2017
|Tales of Harrow County: Worship Music|-
|#23
|May 10, 2017
|Tales of Harrow County: The Possum Lady|-
|#24
|June 14, 2017
|The Devil's Hoof Prints (essay)
|-
|colspan=6 style=background:#e18592|
|-
|rowspan=4|Dark TimesA’Coming|#25
|September 13, 2017
|rowspan=4|Cullen Bunn
|rowspan=4|Tyler Crook
|Granddad's Rocking Chair (essay)
|-
|#26
|October 11, 2017
|Tales of Harrow County: Exterminator|-
|#27
|November 8, 2017
|Tales of Harrow County: Combine|-
|#28
|December 13, 2017
|Tales of Harrow County: The Radio|-
|colspan=6 style=background:#adbe62|
|-
|rowspan=4|DoneComeBack|#29
|March 21, 2018
|rowspan=4|Cullen Bunn
|rowspan=4|Tyler Crook
|Tales of Harrow County: HenryChurch Camp, Broken Pinky-Toe, and Floating Coffins (essay)
|-
|#30
|April 25, 2018
|Tales of Harrow County: Scripture|-
|#31
|May 30, 2018
|rowspan=2|—
|-
|#32
|June 27, 2018
|}

Tales of Harrow County
Most issues of Harrow County include Tales of Harrow County backup stories. This extra material is only collected in the hardcover library editions. The one-page story "Lovelorn" (story by Cullen Bunn, art by Tyler Crook) was accidentally left out of Harrow County #31, so Dark Horse Comics debuted it as a free online comic.

Tales from Harrow County
On September 10, 2019, Dark Horse Comics announced the spinoff series Tales from Harrow County (not to be confused with the Tales of Harrow County short stories). The series was initially announced as a way to tell stories with different main characters from many different time periods of Harrow County. Misfit City artist Naomi Franquiz drew the first miniseries, Death's Choir, with Bernice as the protagonist. Emily Schnall later joined the Tales from Harrow County team for the second arc.

Trade paperbacks
The trade paperback collections of Harrow County generally come out around four to five months after the final issue of the arc being collected.

Library editions
After Harrow County finished, Dark Horse Comics announced that the series would be recollected in library editions. These hardcover volumes print the comics at a larger size and collect all the special features from both the original issues and the trade paperback collections.

Omnibus editions
In 2020, Harrow County was recollected in paperback omnibus editions. These editions do not include any special material.

Reception
Critical reception
At the review aggregator website Comic Book Roundup, Harrow County and Tales from Harrow County have received an average score of 8.4 out of 10 based on 205 reviews, with the final issue of the original series averaging at 9.5. In the years since the original series ended, it has shown up on numerous recommended reads and best-of lists for horror comics.

Awards

Soundtrack

In 2015, Tyler Crook released a book soundtrack of Harrow County, a month before Harrow County #1 came out. The music was meant to accompany the series' first arc, Countless Haints, with track titles referencing specific moments. A second volume for the Twice Told arc came out the following year.

The soundtrack was repurposed in 2022 for GraphicAudio's Harrow County audio dramas.

Track listing

Adaptations
Audio drama
In April 2021, Dark Horse Comics announced a they had entered into a multi-year agreement with GraphicAudio to create audio dramas of their comics. The announcement of Harrow County being adapted came the following year in August. The audio drama was released across two volumes, the first on September 26, 2022 and the second on Halloween a month later.

Bunn had long wanted an audio drama of the series and had even been pushing for an audio drama adaption before the GraphicAudio deal happened. Director and adaption writer Scott McCormick selected Harrow County after Dark Horse sent him the first four issues and he became enamored with the narrator's voice. In adapting the story, McCormick kept Bunn's dialogue for the characters, but had to augment and write additional material for the narrator. Crook's book soundtrack was used for the music in the audio drama, though sound designer Abby Rose Raetz also wrote additional pieces inspired by Crook's music.

Board Game
On October 5, 2022, Off the Page Games launched a Kickstarter campaign for Harrow County: The Game of Gothic Conflict. Designed by Jay Cormier and Shad Miller, the game also features original art by Tyler Crook and "flavor text" in the cards and instructions by Cullen Bunn. It is set to debut some time in late 2023.

Television
As part of a first look deal between Universal Cable Productions and Dark Horse, a Harrow County'' television series was in development as of 2015.

References

Dark Horse Comics titles
2015 comics debuts
Comics by Cullen Bunn
Book soundtracks